The Earle & LeBosquet Block, also known as the Redhead & Wellslager Block, is a historic building located in Des Moines, Iowa, United States.  Completed in 1896, the building is a fine example of the work of Des Moines architect Charles E. Eastman.  It shows Eastman's ability to use Neoclassical forms and integrate the more modern Chicago Commercial style.  It is also an early use of terra cotta for architectural detailing and buff-colored brick for the main facade in Des Moines, which became widespread in the city in the following decades.  The main floor housed two commercial spaces and the upper floors were used for warehouse space.  The four-story structure was built by local contractor Gerrit Van Ginkel, and it was owned by attorneys Ira M. Earle and Peter S. LeBosquet.  It replaced a three-story brick building that was built at this location in 1876.  The building was listed on the National Register of Historic Places in 2009.

References

Commercial buildings completed in 1896
Buildings and structures in Des Moines, Iowa
National Register of Historic Places in Des Moines, Iowa
Commercial buildings on the National Register of Historic Places in Iowa
Neoclassical architecture in Iowa
Chicago school architecture in Iowa